Murud is the largest village in Latur District in Maharashtra, India.

Murud is well known for its school, Janta Vidya Mandir, where not only in academics, students have made their mark in extracurricular activities too. A lot of students have featured in the merit list published by its divisional board affiliated to Maharashtra State Board of Secondary and Higher Secondary Education (some in top 5). Abhay Mumbare was the topper in Marathwada region and second topper from Maharashtra State. Kho Kho, football (soccer), volleyball are some of the spots where lot of athletes have done well. Sheela Nade was the captain of the Kho-Kho team at the nationals.

Murud is an important centre of trade and commerce as it is well connected by Highway networks to Latur and Solapur as well. Its  Aathawadi bazar (weekly fair) of cottage animals (especially bulls) is well known.

Murud is also known as biggest "Gram Panchayat" in "Marathwada" region. Here is one ancient temple of "Shree lord Datta" whose "pujari Kashinath Maharaj" was one of the great personality.  
There is only one government D.Ed. college in latur district, which is placed in murud. That college was closed due to cancellation. 
[1] https://www.esakal.com/esakal/20121017/4621617635240365712.htm

Villages in Latur district
Neighbourhoods in Latur
Villages in Latur taluka